A task force (TF) is a unit or formation  established to work on a single defined task or activity. Originally introduced by the United States Navy, the term has now caught on for general usage and is a standard part of NATO terminology.  Many non-military organizations now create "task forces" or task groups for temporary activities that might have once been performed by ad hoc (designated purpose) committees.

Naval

The concept of a naval task force is as old as navies, and prior to that time the assembly of ships for naval operations was referred to as fleets, divisions, or on the smaller scale, squadrons, and flotillas.

Before World War II ships were collected into divisions derived from the Royal Navy's "division" of the line of battle in which one squadron usually remained under the direct command of the Admiral of the Fleet, one squadron was commanded by a Vice Admiral, and one by a Rear Admiral, each of the three squadrons flying different coloured flags, hence the terms flagship and flag officer. The flag of the Fleet Admiral's squadron was red, the Vice Admiral's was white and the Rear Admiral's blue. (The names "Vice" (possibly from advanced) and "Rear" might have derived from sailing positions within the line at the moment of engagement.) In the late 19th century ships were collected in numbered squadrons, which were assigned to named (such as the Asiatic Fleet) and later numbered fleets.

A task force can be assembled using ships from different divisions and squadrons, without requiring a formal and permanent fleet reorganization, and can be easily dissolved following completion of the operational task. The task force concept worked very well, and by the end of World War II about 100 task forces had been created in the U.S. Navy alone.

United States Navy 
In the United States Navy, task forces are generally temporary organizations composed of particular ships, aircraft, submarines, military land forces, or shore service units, assigned to fulfill certain missions. The emphasis is placed on the individual commander of the unit, and references to "Commander, Task Force" ("CTF") are common.

History 
In the U.S. Navy, task forces as part of numbered fleets have been assigned a two-digit number since March 1943, when Commander-in-Chief, United States Fleet, Admiral Ernest J. King assigned odd fleets to those in the Pacific, and even fleets to those in the Atlantic.

The Second Fleet was assigned the Atlantic Fleet, with the Fourth Fleet being assigned to the South Atlantic Force, the Eighth Fleet being assigned to Naval Forces, Northwest African waters, and the Twelfth Fleet assigned to the Naval Forces, Europe.

The United States Navy has used numbered task forces in the same way since 1945. The U.S. Department of Defense often forms a Joint Task Force if the force includes units from other services. Joint Task Force 1 was the atomic bomb test force during the post–World War II Operation Crossroads.

In naval terms, the multinational (Australia, United States, United Kingdom, Canada, and New Zealand) Combined Communications Electronics Board mandates through Allied Communications Publication 113 (ACP 113) the present system, which allocated numbers from 1 to 834. For example, the Royal Navy's Illustrious battle group in 2000 for Exercise Linked Seas, subsequently deployed to Operation Palliser, was Task Group 342.1. The French Navy is allocated the series TF 470–474, and Task Force 473 has been used recently for an Enduring Freedom task force deployment built around the French aircraft carrier Charles de Gaulle (R91). Task Force 142 is the U.S. Navy's Operational Test and Evaluation Force.

Designation 
The first digit of a task force designation is that of its parent fleet while the second is sequential. A task force may be made up of groups, each made up of units. Task groups within a force are numbered by an additional digit separated from the TF number by a decimal point. Task units within a group are indicated by an additional decimal. For example, "the third task unit of the fifth task group of the second task force of the Sixth Fleet would be numbered 62.5.3." This system extends further to task elements, individual ships in a task group. This arrangement was typically abbreviated, so references like TF 11 are commonly seen. Task units are sometimes nicknamed "Taffy", as in "Taffy 3" of Task Force 77, formally Task Unit 77.4.3. There is no requirement for uniqueness over time (e.g., the United States Seventh Fleet used TF 76 in World War II, and off Vietnam, and continued to use TF 70–79 numberings throughout the rest of the twentieth century, and up to 2012).

 List
 Task Force 1 in the U.S. Atlantic Fleet. Used as Army/Navy Joint Task Force 1 during Operation Crossroads and then as Task Force 1 during Operation Sea Orbit (solely U.S. Navy).
 Task Forces 2–10 in the U.S. Atlantic Fleet.
 Task Force 11
 Task Force 16
 Task Force 17
 Task Force 18
 Task Force 19, the reinforcement of Iceland, in July 1941.
 Task Force 31
 Task Force 34
 Task Force 37, a Carrier Battle Group of the British Pacific Fleet redesignated from Task Force 57 in May 1945 conducting operations in the South China Sea, Ryukyu Islands and Japanese Inland Sea during World War II
 Task Force 38, a Carrier Battle Group of the US Navy which served in the Central Pacific during World War II
 Task Force 44, a combined USN and RAN force formed as a part of the South West Pacific Area (command) following the disbandment of the ANZAC Squadron.
 Task Force 57, a Carrier Battle Group of the British Pacific Fleet established in March 1945 as detailed above
 Task Force 58, a Carrier Battle Group of the US Navy which served in the Central Pacific during World War II
 Task Force 61
 Task Force 77—including "Taffy 3", or Task Unit 77.4.3, which gained significant fame during the Battle off Samar during the Battle of Leyte Gulf. Task Force 77 continued in existence, and was deployed to the Sea of Japan during the Korean War, and in the Gulf of Tonkin during the Vietnam War.
 Task Force 80
 Task Force 88
 Task Force 129, during the Bombardment of Cherbourg, 1944

United States Marine Corps
See Marine Air Ground Task Force (MAGTF) for a description of the three standard combined arms task force organizations employed by the USMC.

Royal Navy

Earlier in the Second World War, the British Royal Navy had already devised its own system of Forces, they mainly assigned a letter occasionally a number some of the task forces are listed below .

Lettered task forces 
Force A 
Originally stationed at Malta took part in the Battle of Calabria in 1940 it transferred Trincomalee and was a component of the (fast force) of the Eastern Fleet during the Indian Ocean raid April to May 1942.
Force B
Originally stationed at Malta, took part in the Battle of Calabria on 9 July 1940, took part in the Battle of Cape Spartivento, 27 November 1940, was involved in the First Battle of Sirte, 17 December 1941 it then moved to Trincomalee in March 1942 was a component (slow force) of the Eastern Fleet during the Indian Ocean raid April to May 1942.
Force H 
Formed as part of a number of hunting task groups on 5 October 1939 as a prelude to Battle of the River Plate, 13 December 1939 and part of the South America Division after which it was stationed at, Gibraltar, took part in Operation Catapult, 3 July 1940,  took part in Operation Rheinübung 19 May - 15 June 1941. 
Force K
Part of a number of hunting task groups on 5 October 1939 as a prelude to Battle of the River Plate, 13 December 1939 based in Freetown it was then stationed at, Malta, took part in the Battle of the Tarigo Convoy, 16 April 1941, was involved in the First Battle of Sirte, 17 December 1941 then moved to Freetown in December 1941.
Force Z, was stationed at Singapore, known for the destruction of its two capital ships in the Sinking of Prince of Wales and Repulse.

Numbered task forces 
Force 1 
Formed to deal with the Tirpitz Sortie against convoys PQ 12 and QP8, 6–13 March 1942.
Force 62 
Formed 13 May 1945 and took part in the Battle off Penang - the Battle of the Malacca Strait.
Task Force 57, later renamed Task Force 37 (USN-allocated names for a Carrier Battle Group of the British Pacific Fleet in 1945).

Post-World War II 
During Operation Corporate of the Falklands War in 1982 Royal Navy forces assembled as Task Force 317, often referred to in general use as "The Task Force", to achieve sea and air supremacy in the Falklands Total Exclusion Zone, before the amphibious forces arrived.

French Navy
The French Navy uses the name Task Force 473 to designate any power projection by the sea. This Task Force can be composed of a carrier battle group articulated around the aircraft carrier Charles de Gaulle, or it can be composed of an amphibious group articulated around a Mistral-class amphibious assault ship.

Other
In Argentina, Navy Task Units of Task Group (Grupo de Tareas)  were responsible for thousands of instances of forced disappearance, torture and illegal execution of Argentine civilians, many of whom were incarcerated in the Higher School of Mechanics of the Navy detention center during the 1976–1983 military dictatorship.

During the Falklands War in 1982 the Argentine Navy formed three smaller Grupos de Tareas (Task Groups) for pincer movements against the Royal Navy.

Army
In the U.S. Army, a task force is a battalion-sized (usually, although there are variations in size) ad hoc unit formed by attaching smaller elements of other units.  A company-sized unit with an armored or mechanized infantry unit attached is called a company team. A similar unit at the brigade level is called a brigade combat team (BCT), and there is also a similar Regimental combat team (RCT).

In the British Army and the armies of other Commonwealth countries, such units are traditionally known as battlegroups.

The 1st Australian Task Force (1 ATF) was a brigade-sized formation which commanded Australian and New Zealand Army units deployed to South Vietnam between 1966 and 1972. More recently, Australian task forces have been designated to cover temporary support elements such the battalion-sized force which operated in Urozgan Province, Afghanistan from 2006 to 2013, and the Northern Territory Emergency Response Task Force.

Government

In government or business a task force is a temporary organization created to solve a particular problem. It is considered to be a more formal ad hoc committee.

A taskforce, or more commonly, task force, is a special committee, usually of experts, formed expressly for the purpose of studying a particular problem. The task force usually performs some sort of an audit to assess the current situation, then draws up a list of all the current problems present and evaluates which ones merit fixing and which ones are actually fixable. The task force would then formulate a set of solutions to the problems and pick the "best" solution to each problem, as determined by some set of standards. For example, a task force set up to eliminate excessive government spending might consider a "best" solution to be one that saves the most money. Normally, the task force then presents its findings and proposed solutions to the institution that called for its formation; it is then up to the institution itself to actually act upon the task force's recommendations.

Business 
In business, task forces are initiated similar to military situations to form an ad hoc group of persons that focus on a specific subject, which needs urgent addressing, resolutions or results. Subject-specific task forces are very common. NASA lessons contain information from different task forces. This can be seen specifically in the COVID-19 crisis, but in many normal project contexts as well, where a dedicated group of experts investigates or takes on a specific request or problem and develops or translates it into results as quick as possible. It is important to know that a task force in project context should stick to certain rules, which have to be coordinated and controlled by a assigned task force leader or by the project manager. Good leadership is a key element of the task force leader, as it is usually asking an extra effort from all resources involved.

Other data regarding US task forces
 Some task forces are named after their commander, such as Dunsterforce.
 Task Force Tarawa, the name given the 2nd Marine Expeditionary Brigade during the 2003 invasion of Iraq Operation Iraqi Freedom. They were a Marine Air-Ground Task Force commanded by Brigadier General Richard Natonski, attached to the I Marine Expeditionary Force.
 Task Force Leatherneck is the name given the 2nd Marine Expeditionary Brigade during their 2009 operations in Afghanistan as part of Operation Enduring Freedom. They are a Marine Air-Ground Task Force commanded by Brigadier General Larry Nicholson, assigned to work under the International Security Assistance Force.
 US Army Task Force Lethal is the name for 2-12 Infantry battalion out of Fort Carson, Colorado. Part of the Army's 4th Infantry Division, 4th Brigade Combat Team, 2nd Battalion, 12th Infantry Regiment Task Force Lethal. Some of the heaviest firefights US troops were engaged in were in the Kunar province by teams of Task Force Lethal, there to replace members of the 173rd Airborne units and their outpost Restrepo.  Task Force Lethal is assigned to work as part of the International Security Assistance Force.  Task Force Lethal prides itself as one of the Army's premier multi-task light Infantry units that has trained at home in the mountainous regions of the Rocky Mountains in Colorado and excels at high altitude warfare.  The commandos of Task Force Lethal have remained one of the US Army's most elite task forces in the global War on Terror since the start in 2003.
 Task Force 1-41 Infantry was a U.S. Army heavy battalion task force which took part in the Gulf War of January–March 1991. Task Force 1-41 Infantry was the first coalition force to breach the Saudi Arabian border on 15 February 1991 and conduct ground combat operations in Iraq engaging in direct and indirect fire fights with the enemy on 17 February 1991. It consisted primarily of the 1st Battalion, 41st Infantry Regiment, 3rd Battalion, 66th Armor Regiment, and the 4th Battalion, 3rd Field Artillery Regiment, all being part of the 2nd Armored Division (Forward), based at Lucius D. Clay Kaserne, 24 kilometres (15 mi) north of Bremen, in the Federal Republic of Germany.

See also
 Internet Engineering Task Force
 Joint Task Force
 Kampfgruppe
 Space Task Group
 Task management

References

Further reading
Timothy M. Bonds, Myron Hura, Thomas-Durrell Young (2010). Enhancing Army Joint Force Headquarters Capabilities. Santa Monica, CA: RAND Corporation.

 
Military units and formations by size
Problem solving